In mathematics, in the study of dynamical systems, the Hartman–Grobman theorem or linearisation theorem is a theorem about the local behaviour of dynamical systems in the neighbourhood of a hyperbolic equilibrium point.  It asserts that linearisation—a natural simplification of the system—is effective in predicting qualitative patterns of behaviour. The theorem owes its name to Philip Hartman and David M. Grobman.

The theorem states that the behaviour of a dynamical system in a domain near a hyperbolic equilibrium point is qualitatively the same as the behaviour of its linearization near this equilibrium point, where hyperbolicity means that no eigenvalue of the linearization has real part equal to zero. Therefore, when dealing with such dynamical systems one can use the simpler linearization of the system to analyse its behaviour around equilibria.

Main theorem 
Consider a system evolving in time with state  that satisfies the differential equation  for some smooth map . Then there exists a neighbourhood  of the equilibrium  and a homeomorphism ,

Even for infinitely differentiable maps , the homeomorphism  need not to be smooth, nor even locally Lipschitz.

The Hartman–Grobman theorem has been extended to infinite-dimensional Banach spaces, non-autonomous systems  (potentially stochastic), and to cater for the topological differences that occur when there are eigenvalues with zero or near-zero real-part.

Example

The algebra necessary for this example is easily carried out by a web service that computes normal form coordinate transforms of systems of differential equations, autonomous or non-autonomous, deterministic or stochastic.

Consider the 2D system in variables  evolving according to the pair of coupled differential equations

 

The coordinate transform,  where , given by

 

is a smooth map between the original  and new  coordinates, at least near the equilibrium at the origin.  In the new coordinates the dynamical system transforms to its linearisation

 

That is, a distorted version of the linearisation gives the original dynamics in some finite neighbourhood.

See also
Linear approximation
Stable manifold theorem

References

Further reading

External links

 
 

Theorems in analysis
Theorems in dynamical systems
Approximations